The 2004 Rutgers Scarlet Knights football team represented Rutgers University in the 2004 NCAA Division I FBS football season. The Scarlet Knights were led by fourth-year head coach Greg Schiano and played their home games at Rutgers Stadium. They were a member of the Big East Conference. They finished the season 4–7, 1–5 in Big East play to finish in a tie with Temple for last place.

Schedule

References

Rutgers
Rutgers Scarlet Knights football seasons
Rutgers Scarlet Knights football